Montesano may refer to:

Places
Montesano, Washington, U.S. city in Grays Harbor County, Washington
Montesano Salentino, Italian municipality in the Province of Lecce
Montesano sulla Marcellana, Italian municipality in the Province of Salerno
Monte Sano Mountain, in the U.S. state of Alabama

People
Enrico Montesano (born 1945), Italian actor

Other
Montesano (sternwheeler), steamboat that operated in Oregon and Washington, U.S., in the late 19th century